Mirada de mujer: El regreso is a Mexican telenovela, which was produced by and broadcast on Azteca Uno in 2003. It is the sequel of Mirada de Mujer (1997).

Synopsis
The story takes place seven years after the end of Mirada de Mujer, when Alejandro Salas had left for Spain with his son, Alex. While in Spain, Alejandro has become an internationally acclaimed author. He is also involved with a woman named Verónica. Seven years later he comes back to Mexico to receive an award for his book. In the meantime, María Inés decides to marry Jerónimo Cardenas, a doctor. Ignacio, María Inés' former husband, is about to run for Senate. He soon discovers that Daniela, his young wife, is cheating on him.

While María Inés visits the grave of her best friend, Paulina, she meets Alejandro. The story develops and María Inés must choose between Alejandro or Jerónimo.

Theme song
The theme song of the telenovela is "Mentira" (in English "It's a lie") and it is performed by Gilberto Santa Rosa.

Cast

 Angélica Aragón as María Inés Domínguez de San Millán
 Ari Telch  as Alejandro Salas
 Héctor Bonilla as Jerónimo
 Fernando Luján as Lic. Ignacio San Millán
 Evangelina Elizondo as Doña Emilia Elena viuda de Domínguez 'Mamá Elena'
 Verónica Langer as Rosario
 María Renée Prudencio as Adriana San Millán
 Bárbara Mori  as Mónica San Millán
 Plutarco Haza as Andrés San Millán
 Álvaro Carcaño Jr as Nicolás
 Olmo Araiza  as Alex Salas
 Patricia Llaca as  Verónica Segovia
 Mónica Dionne as  Paloma Santiago
 René Gatica  as Francisco
 Iliana Fox as Ana Camila
 Anna Ciocchetti as  Sara Cárdenas
 Hector Arredondo as  Julián
 Mauricio Ochmann ....  José Chacón
 Ana Serradilla as  Carolina
 Martha Mariana Castro as Daniela
 Rodrigo Abed as  Rodrigo
 Xavier Massimi as  Santiago

External links

 Alma Latina: Mirada de Mujer Page

2003 telenovelas
2003 Mexican television series debuts
2003 Mexican television series endings
Mexican telenovelas
TV Azteca telenovelas
Sequel television series
Spanish-language telenovelas